Dolores "Loló" Soldevilla Nieto (1901–1971) was a Cuban visual artist primarily known for her role in concrete art.

Biography 
Born in 1901 in Havana, Cuba, Soldevilla was an avid painter, sculptor, collage artist and draughtsman. In addition to being 
 journalist and teacher</ref> In Paris, she was influenced by the European avant-garde, most notably abstraction. In 1956, Soldevilla along with her husband and fellow artist Pedro de Oraá, returned to Cuba and founded Galeria Color-Luz, an artistic space solely focused on the promotion of abstract art, with the contribution of Eduardo Abela, Amelia Peláez, Wilfredo Arcay, Agustín Fernández, and others</ref><ref>"Loló Soldevilla, November 29th, 2011 - January 6th, 2012". Oraá and Loló, along with Romanian-born artist Sandu Darie among others, were the pioneers of Concretism or Cuban Abstraction in 1950s Cuba, as well as the founders of the group Los Diez Pintores Concretos (The 10 concrete painters) or known simply as Los Diez (the ten).

Soldevilla graduated from the Falcón Conservatory for singing and the violin, founding the short-lived group La Orchestra de Loló (Lolo's Orchestra) before taking up painting in 1948. During the 1930s, she was a seminal political activist, enduring detainment for participation in several political rallies, as well as imprisonment in the Prison for Women in Guanabacoa, in 1935 for her positions against the Machado dictatorship. She also helped found the Partido Aprista of Cuba, along with Enrique de la Osa and Guillermo de Zéndegui among others and integrated the Executive National Committee for this political organization. In 1949, she traveled to Paris as a cultural attaché for the Cuban Embassy and enrolled in the Académie de la Grande Chaumière, where she started to develop works that would later on that year, encompass her first two shows. Among her returns to Cuba, Soldevilla traveled extensively during her career, she was influenced by the avant-garde of several countries in Europe and Latin America including Spain, Switzerland, the Netherlands, Belgium, Great Britain, Austria, Germany, Venezuela, and Brazil among others. In 1951, she joined the artist workshop Atelier d’Art Abstrait founded by Deswane and Pillet, with whom she collaborated with for two years; she also attended a course on engraving techniques with Hayter and Cochet.

Soldevilla traveled back and forth from the island exhibiting her works and garnering a group of contemporaries who would soon help her expand the influence of concrete abstraction in Cuba. In 1957, after a stint in Venezuela Soldevilla returned to Cuba with her husband and fellow artist Pedro de Oraá and together founded Galeria Color-Luz, gallery focused on Concrete Abstraction and the Ten Concrete Painters (Los Diez). Although Los Diez and Color-Luz were short-lived, lasting only from 1957-1961, Soldevilla kept painting and collaborated with several magazines and newspapers such as Revolución. From the revolution in 1959 to the early sixties, she became the professor of Fine Arts in the School of Architecture at the University of Havana. In 1964, she founded the group of painters Espacio, and became a member of UPEC, a journalist union and the group UNEAC (La Union de Escritores y Artistas de Cuba) the Union of Writers and Artists of Cuba. Loló Soldevilla died in 1971.

History 

Los Diez Pintores Concretos (The 10 concrete painters) were..." a group that established the style of ‘Concretism’ or ‘Concrete’ art in 1950s Cuba and fashioned a whole new, unique language of abstraction." Soldevilla's take on geometric abstraction played an important role in the development of concretismo in Cuba as well as in the international scene.

Soldevilla's education in Paris and the bonds she formed between her teachers, students and fellow contemporaries led to her producing her most important body of work in the years between 1950-1957. Her collage work from this period is a study of the geometries of circles, rectangles, lines and colors, creating a rhythm with their variation of size and shape. Diagonals, opposing elements, contrasting colors and organic geometric style set Loló apart from her fellow contemporaries, as did her asymmetric metal kinetic sculptures.

The main philosophy of concrete art is that it is an extremely introverted art form, it has no narrative, no basis or reference in the natural world and has no defining qualities except the simple admiration of its colors and shapes. Soldevilla was a principal advocate of this style and movement. Just as Soldevilla's opening of Galeria Color-Luz incubated Los Diez, its closing in 1961 marked the official dissolution of the group after exhibiting together only three times. The last decade of her life would be spent in journalistic and literary pursuits, she worked with several magazines and newspapers and even wrote a memoir about her life in Paris entitled, Ir, venir, volver a ir: crónicas (1952-1957) (“Going, Coming, Going Back: Chronicles, [1952-1957]”). An avid writer she wrote novels, plays and even a ballet. Although she exhibited little in the 1960s, she remains a seminal, revolutionary figure in the history of Cuban art and the flowering of concretism and concrete art.

Exhibitions 

2018
 
3Concrete, Kendall Art Center, Miami, FL (group) 

2017 

Triángulo – Loló Soldevilla, Sandu Darie and Carmen Herrera, organized by The Cisneros Fontanals Art Foundation (CIFO), CIFO Art Space Miami 
 
2016

Concrete Cuba, David Zwirner's 20th Street Gallery, New York, NY (group)
Diálogos constructivistas en la vanguardia cubana, Galerie Lelong, New York, NY (group)

2015

Concrete Cuba, David Zwirner Gallery, London, England (group)
Soto Voce, Dominique Lévy, London, England (group)

2006
Loló: an imaginary world, Museo Nacional de Bellas Artes, Havana, Cuba (solo) 
Art of Cuba, Traveling Exhibition, Brazil (group)
Cuba: Art and Art History, Traveling Exhibition (group)

1970

Casa de la Cultura Czechoslovakia, Collages, Czech Republic

1966

Op art, Havana Gallery, Havana, Cuba (solo)
Pop art, Havana Gallery, Havana, Cuba (solo)
Moon and me, Havana Gallery, Havana, Cuba (solo)

1957–1961

A, Feria del Arte Cubano, Cuba (group) 
Homenaje al pequeño cuadrado, Galeria Color-Luz, Havana, Cuba (group)
El arte abstracto en Europa, Galeria Color-Luz, Havana, Cuba (group)

1957

Loló: 1953-1956, Palace of Fine Arts, Havana, Cuba (solo)

1956

Painting Today: The Vanguard of the School of Paris, Palace of Fine Arts, Havana, Cuba (solo)

1955

Luminous Reliefs, Réalités Nouvelles, Paris, France (solo)

1954

Circle of the University, Valencia, Spain (joint exhibition)

1953

Loló/Varela, Arnaud Gallery, Paris, France (joint exhibition)

1952

Sociedad Cultural Nuestro Tiempo, Havana, Cuba (solo)
Palacio de Sanata Cruz, Madrid, Spain (solo)

1951

Art cubain contemporain, Musée National d’Art Moderne, Paris, France (group)

1950
 
Loló. Sculptures, Lyceum of Havana, Havana, Cuba (solo) 
Loló 20 oil paintings, School of Law at the University of Havana, Havana, Cuba (solo)

1949

Salon d'art Monaco, France, (solo) 
Academy of Fine Arts, Paris, France (solo)

Notable works in public collections 
Sin título [Untitled from the series Cartas celestiales (Celestial Letters)], 1957. Pérez Art Museum Miami, Miami

References 

1901 births
1971 deaths
20th-century Cuban women artists
20th-century Cuban painters
People from Havana